Chongwe District is a district of Zambia, located in Lusaka Province. The capital lies at Chongwe. As of the 2000 Zambian Census, the district had a population of 137,461 people.

Before 1997, Chongwe District, together with Kafue District and Rufunsa District, was known as "Lusaka Rural".

Chongwe is home to Chalimbana University (formerly National In-service Teachers College - NISTCOL).

References

Districts of Lusaka Province